Hypolysia connollyana is a species of small tropical air-breathing land snails, terrestrial pulmonate gastropod mollusks in the family Achatinidae. This species is endemic to Tanzania.

References

Endemic fauna of Tanzania
Fauna of Tanzania
connollyana
Taxonomy articles created by Polbot